The Wiedemann Range is a mountain range in King Christian IX Land, eastern Greenland. Administratively this range is part of the Sermersooq Municipality.

History
The range was visited in 1932 by a team of geologists belonging to Ejnar Mikkelsen's Second East-Greenland Expedition. It was named after German naturalist Christian Rudolph Wilhelm Wiedemann (1770–1840).

In 1962, a VP-5 Lockheed P-2 Neptune on a patrol mission crashed into the slope of the Kronborg Glacier close to this range, killing all twelve men aboard. The crash site was finally discovered in 1966 when four geologists found it, but it was not until 2004 that the US Navy recovered all the crew remains and memorialized the deceased at the crash site.

Geography
The southern end of the range rises close to the sea, in the Denmark Strait area, north of Cape Stephensen and NW of the Vedel Fjord. It stretches northwards at the head of the Wiedemann Fjord, bound by the Kronborg Glacier to the west —beyond which rises the Lilloise Range— and the Borggraven Glacier to the east. The area of the range is uninhabited.

See also
List of mountain ranges of Greenland
List of Nunataks§Greenland
Blosseville Coast

References

External links
The East Greenland rifted volcanic margin - ResearchGate

Mountain ranges of Greenland
Nunataks of Greenland
Sermersooq